Linwood  is a community in the Canadian province of Nova Scotia, located  in Antigonish County.
Linwood, Nova Scotia is a small coastal community located halfway between the town of Antigonish and the Canso Causeway. Located around Linwood Harbour, Linwood has two campgrounds, both with a view of the Harbour, along with a short hiking trail, picnic park, ice rink (in winter) and a community centre.

References

Further reading

Communities in Antigonish County, Nova Scotia